The following outline is provided as an overview of and topical guide to Haiti:

The Haiti – sovereign country located on the Caribbean island of Hispaniola in the Greater Antilles archipelago. Ayiti ("Land of Mountains") was the indigenous Taíno name for Hispaniola. The Haitian Creole and French-speaking  country of Haiti occupies the western extent of Hispaniola, while the Spanish-speaking Dominican Republic occupies the greater eastern extent of the island. Haiti was the first country of the Americas to win its freedom from European colonization in 1804. The total area of Haiti is 27,750 square kilometres (10,714 sq mi) and its capital is Port-au-Prince.

General reference

 Pronunciation: 
 Common English country name: Haiti
 Official English country name: The Republic of Haiti
 Common endonym(s):  
 Official endonym(s):  
 Adjectival(s): Haitian
 Demonym(s):
 Etymology: Name of Haiti
 ISO country codes: HT, HTI, 332
 ISO region codes: See ISO 3166-2:HT
 Internet country code top-level domain: .ht

Geography of Haiti 

Geography of Haiti
 Haiti is: a country, on an island
 Location:
 Northern Hemisphere and Western Hemisphere
 North America (though not on the mainland)
 Atlantic Ocean
 North Atlantic
 Caribbean
 Antilles
 Greater Antilles
 Hispaniola, island (which Haiti shares with the Dominican Republic)
 Time zone:  UTC-05
 Extreme points of Haiti
 High:  Pic la Selle 
 Low:  Caribbean Sea 0 m
 Land boundaries:   360 km
 Coastline:  1,771 km
 Population of Haiti: 9,598,000  - 85th most populous country

 Area of Haiti: 27,750 km2
 Atlas of Haiti

Environment of Haiti 

Environment of Haiti
 Climate of Haiti
 Environmental issues in Haiti
 Renewable energy in Haiti
 Geology of Haiti
 Protected areas of Haiti
 Biosphere reserves in Haiti
 National parks of Haiti
 Wildlife of Haiti
 Fauna of Haiti
 Birds of Haiti
 Mammals of Haiti

Natural geographic features of Haiti 
 Fjords of Haiti
 Glaciers of Haiti
 Islands of Haiti
 Lakes of Haiti
 Mountains of Haiti
 Volcanoes in Haiti
 Rivers of Haiti
 Waterfalls of Haiti
 Valleys of Haiti
 World Heritage Sites in Haiti

Regions of Haiti 
Regions of Haiti

Ecoregions of Haiti 

List of ecoregions in Haiti

Administrative divisions of Haiti 
Administrative divisions of Haiti
 Departments of Haiti
 Arrondissements of Haiti
 List of communes of Haiti

Departments of Haiti 

Departments of Haiti

Arrondissements and communes of Haiti 

Arrondissements and communes of Haiti

Municipalities of Haiti 
 Capital of Haiti: Port-au-Prince
 Cities of Haiti

Demography of Haiti 
Demographics of Haiti

Government and politics of Haiti 
Politics of Haiti
 Form of government: presidential republic
 Capital of Haiti: Port-au-Prince
 Elections in Haiti

 Political parties in Haiti

Branches of the government of Haiti 

Government of Haiti

Executive branch of the government of Haiti 
 Head of state: President of Haiti, Jovenel Moïse
 Head of government: Prime Minister of Haiti, Evans Paul
 Cabinet of Haiti
 Haiti

Legislative branch of the government of Haiti 
 National Assembly of Haiti (bicameral)
 Upper house: Senate of Haiti
 Lower house: Chamber of Deputies of Haiti

Judicial branch of the government of Haiti 

Court system of Haiti
 Supreme Court of Haiti

Foreign relations of Haiti 

Foreign relations of Haiti
 Diplomatic missions in Haiti
 Diplomatic missions of Haiti

International organization membership 

International organization membership of Haiti
The Republic of Haiti is a member of:

African, Caribbean, and Pacific Group of States (ACP)
Agency for the Prohibition of Nuclear Weapons in Latin America and the Caribbean (OPANAL)
Caribbean Community and Common Market (Caricom)
Caribbean Development Bank (CDB)
Food and Agriculture Organization (FAO)
Group of 77 (G77)
Inter-American Development Bank (IADB)
International Atomic Energy Agency (IAEA)
International Bank for Reconstruction and Development (IBRD)
International Civil Aviation Organization (ICAO)
International Criminal Court (ICCt) (signatory)
International Criminal Police Organization (Interpol)
International Development Association (IDA)
International Federation of Red Cross and Red Crescent Societies (IFRCS)
International Finance Corporation (IFC)
International Fund for Agricultural Development (IFAD)
International Hydrographic Organization (IHO)
International Maritime Organization (IMO)
International Monetary Fund (IMF)
International Olympic Committee (IOC)
International Organization for Migration (IOM)
International Red Cross and Red Crescent Movement (ICRM)
International Telecommunication Union (ITU)

International Telecommunications Satellite Organization (ITSO)
International Trade Union Confederation (ITUC)
Latin American Economic System (LAES)
Multilateral Investment Guarantee Agency (MIGA)
Nonaligned Movement (NAM)
Organisation internationale de la Francophonie (OIF)
Organisation for the Prohibition of Chemical Weapons (OPCW)
Organization of American States (OAS)
Permanent Court of Arbitration (PCA)
Union Latine
United Nations (UN)
United Nations Conference on Trade and Development (UNCTAD)
United Nations Educational, Scientific, and Cultural Organization (UNESCO)
United Nations Industrial Development Organization (UNIDO)
Universal Postal Union (UPU)
World Confederation of Labour (WCL)
World Customs Organization (WCO)
World Federation of Trade Unions (WFTU)
World Health Organization (WHO)
World Intellectual Property Organization (WIPO)
World Meteorological Organization (WMO)
World Tourism Organization (UNWTO)
World Trade Organization (WTO)

Law and order in Haiti 
Law of Haiti
 Constitution of Haiti
 Crime in Haiti
Prostitution in Haiti
 Human rights in Haiti
 Women's rights in Haiti
 LGBT rights in Haiti
 Freedom of religion in Haiti
 Law enforcement in Haiti

Military of Haiti 
Military of Haiti
 Command
 Commander-in-chief: Jean Joseph Exume (as Minister of Justice & Public Security)
 Ministry of Justice & Public Security
 Forces
 Haitian National Police
 Military history of Haiti
 Military ranks of Haiti

Local government in Haiti 

Departments of Haiti

 Artibonite
 Centre
 Grand'Anse
 Nippes
 Nord
 Nord-Est
 Nord-Ouest
 Ouest
 Sud
 Sud-Est

History of Haiti 

History of Haiti
Timeline of the history of Haiti
Current events of Haiti
 Military history of Haiti

Culture of Haiti 
Culture of Haiti
 Architecture of Haiti
 Cuisine of Haiti
 Festivals in Haiti
 Languages of Haiti
 Media in Haiti
 National Museum of Haiti
 National Palace
 National symbols of Haiti
 Coat of arms of Haiti
 Flag of Haiti
 National anthem of Haiti
 People of Haiti
 Prostitution in Haiti
 Public holidays in Haiti
 Records of Haiti
 Religion in Haiti
 Christianity in Haiti
 Hinduism in Haiti
 Islam in Haiti
 Judaism in Haiti
 Sikhism in Haiti
 World Heritage Sites in Haiti

Art in Haiti 
 Art in Haiti
 Cinema of Haiti
 Literature of Haiti
 Music of Haiti
 National Museum of Art, Haiti
 Television in Haiti
 Theatre in Haiti

Sports in Haiti 
Sports in Haiti
 Football in Haiti
Haiti at the Olympics

Economy and infrastructure of Haiti 
Economy of Haiti
 Economic rank, by nominal GDP (2007): 135th (one hundred and thirty fifth)
 Agriculture in Haiti
 Banking in Haiti
 Central Bank of Haiti
 Communications in Haiti
 Internet in Haiti
 Companies of Haiti
Currency of Haiti: Gourde
ISO 4217: HTG
 Energy in Haiti
 Energy policy of Haiti
 Oil industry in Haiti
 Health care in Haiti
 Mining in Haiti
 Haiti Stock Exchange
 Tourism in Haiti
 Transport in Haiti
 Airports in Haiti
 Rail transport in Haiti
 Roads in Haiti
 Water supply and sanitation in Haiti

Education in Haiti 
Education in Haiti

Health in Haiti 

Health in Haiti

See also

Haiti
Index of Haiti-related articles
List of Haiti-related topics
List of international rankings
Member state of the United Nations
Outline of geography
Outline of North America
Outline of the Caribbean

References

External links

 The professional platform for Haitians and Friends of Haiti.
 The place to share Haiti News, chat, economic ideas, music, and haitian movies.
 If It's About Haiti, It's On Fouye!
 Haiti: Current events, news, politics, nonprofit
 Embassy of Haiti to the United States, in Washington, DC
 Library of Congress - A Country Study: Haiti
 VOA kreyol
 Encyclopædia Britannica - Haiti's country page
 International Action: Fighting the Water Crisis in Haiti
 Hope for Haiti: Education and grassroots development in rural Haiti
 Search engine for the.ht tld (in french)
 Official website of The National Telecommunications Council, Conatel (in French)
 National Archives of Haiti materials in the Digital Library of the Caribbean
 Haiti List
 Bob Corbett's Haiti Page
 The Carter Center information on Haiti

Haiti